Joseph Willard Roosevelt (January 16, 1918 – May 18, 2008) was an American pianist and composer.

Biography
He was the second son of Kermit Roosevelt and Belle Wyatt Willard. His paternal grandparents were U.S. President Theodore "T.R." Roosevelt, Jr. and First Lady Edith Kermit Carow.

Roosevelt attended, like several of his family members, Groton School and Harvard University and studied piano with Nadia Boulanger in France.

He served in the Pacific during World War II.  He was commissioned in the Naval Reserve on August 19, 1940 and was promoted to lieutenant on March 1, 1943. Later in the war, he served as captain of the USS Greene, (APD-36).   With the Greene he supported the invasion of southern France in August 1944 and later served on escort duties in the Pacific.

Joseph was first married to Nancy Thayer, daughter of E. E. Cummings and Elaine Orr.

He taught music at The Hartt School, Mannes College of Music, Fairleigh Dickinson University and the Longy School of Music.

Roosevelt's compositions are published by the American Composers Alliance and Merion Music.

Roosevelt died at the age of 90 on May 18, 2008.

Personal life
Roosevelt was named for his grandfather, Virginia Lieutenant Governor and United States Ambassador to Spain Joseph Edward Willard. His brother is Kermit Roosevelt Jr.; his nephew is Mark Roosevelt; his great-nephews are Kermit Roosevelt III, John Palfrey and Quentin Palfrey.

Roosevelt married first Nancy Cummings, who at the time was known as Nancy Thayer due to her unknowingness regarding her father (she believed it was poet Scofield Thayer due to what her mother told her; it was actually poet E.E. Cummings) on December 22, 1943 in New York City. They had two children:
 Simon Willard Roosevelt (1945-1965), who died in a motorcycle accident at age 19; he married Ann Whitney Alexander on January 2, 1964, in Pittsfield, Massachusetts, and they had a son, Simon Cummings Roosevelt a few months later.
 Elizabeth Francoise Roosevelt (b. 1947), who married Derek C. Aldred in January 1966 in Hammersmith, England.

Roosevelt and Cummings would divorce, and Roosevelt married secondly Carol Adele Russell on May 28, 1955 in Mendon, Vermont. They had three children:
 Dirck Roosevelt (b. 1955)
 Caleb Willard Roosevelt (1963-1982), who died in a car accident in Pittsfield, Mass.
 David Russell Roosevelt (1965-1986), who died after flipping his father's truck near Sandisfield, Mass.

Selected works
Opera
 And the Walls Came Tumbling Down (1976); 1 act with libretto by Loften Mitchell

Orchestra / band
 Amistad for orchestra (1960)
 Band Piece No. 1 (1979)
 Band Piece No. 2 (1979)
 Concerto for cello and orchestra (1963)
 Concerto for piano and orchestra
 Suite for oboe, bassoon and string orchestra (1959)

Chamber / instrumental
 Flute and Fiddle, 4 Duos for 5 flutes (bass, alto, standard, shakuhachi, piccolo) and 2 fiddles (violin, viola) (1975)
 The Judgement of Paris for flute (also alto flute) and optional mime (1975)
 Lament for Willie Thomas Jones for 4 cellos (1975)
 The Leaden and the Golden Echo for reciter and piano (1957); text by Gerard Manley Hopkins
 Paul Revere's Ride for flute solo and optional mime (1975)
 Serenade for oboe, viola and cello (1955)
 Short Suite for oboe, clarinet and bassoon (1982)
 Sonata for cello and piano (1953)
 Sonata for violin and piano
 Song and Dance Suite for oboe, clarinet and viola (1975)
 String Quartet
 Suite for viola solo (1963)
 Trio for clarinet, cello and piano (1952)
 Waltz for flute (or clarinet) and piano (1978)

Piano
 Dance Suite (1982)
 Sonata No. 1 in D major
 Sonata No. 2 in B major
 Suite (1963)

Vocal
 An American Sampler, 4 Songs for soprano, horn and piano (1976); words by Phyllis Wheatley, Edward Coote Pinkney, Philip Freneau, Charles F. Hoffman
 Aria (Oh, Joshua) for voice and piano (1970); words by Loften Mitchell
 Four Songs for soprano and clarinet (1975); words by Lloyd Frankenberg and E. E. Cummings
 Five Songs for soprano and viola (1975); words by Lloyd Frankenberg and E. E. Cummings
 Five Songs from Caleb for voice and piano (1990); words by Caleb Roosevelt
 May Song It Flourish for Soprano, mezzo-soprano, baritone and chamber orchestra (1960); words by James Joyce
 Three Songs for baritone and piano (1991); words by Gerard Manley Hopkins
 Three Songs from Poe for soprano, clarinet and piano (1977); words by Edgar Allan Poe
 Two Songs for voice and piano (1967); words by E. E. Cummings
 Two Songs for voice and piano (1973); words by Lloyd Frankenberg
 War Is Kind (Our Dead Brother Bid Us Think of Life) for soprano, narrator, dancer and chamber orchestra (1976); words by Stephen Crane and Oliver Wendell Holmes, Jr.

References

External links
 New York Times obituary
 Williard Roosevelt at the American Composers Alliance

1918 births
2008 deaths
American male classical composers
American classical composers
American classical pianists
Male classical pianists
American male pianists
American people of Dutch descent
Groton School alumni
Harvard University alumni
Longy School of Music of Bard College faculty
American opera composers
Male opera composers
Joseph
Schuyler family
University of Hartford Hartt School faculty
The New School faculty
Fairleigh Dickinson University faculty
United States Navy officers
United States Navy personnel of World War II
20th-century classical pianists
20th-century American pianists
20th-century American composers
20th-century American male musicians